Firuz Kandeh-ye Olya (also Romanized as Fīrūz Kandeh-ye ‘Olyā; also known as Bālā Maḩalleh-ye Fīrūz Kandeh, Fīrūz Kand, Fīrūz Kandeh, and Fīrūz Kandeh-ye Bālā) is a village in Rudpey-ye Jonubi Rural District, in the Central District of Sari County, Mazandaran Province, Iran. At the 2006 census, its population was 1,068, in 271 families.

References 

Populated places in Sari County